Waldemaro Bartolozzi (26 October 1927 – 16 December 2020) was an Italian racing cyclist. He finished in ninth place in the 1956 Giro d'Italia.

References

External links
 

1927 births
2020 deaths
People from Scandicci
Italian male cyclists
Sportspeople from the Metropolitan City of Florence
Cyclists from Tuscany